Clement Walter Labine (August 6, 1926 – March 2, 2007) was an American right-handed relief pitcher in Major League Baseball (MLB) best known for his years with the Brooklyn / Los Angeles Dodgers from 1950 to 1960. As a key member of the Dodgers in the early 1950s, he helped the team to its first World Series title in 1955 with a win and a save in four games. He is one of eight players in MLB history to have won back-to back World Series championships on different teams, the other seven being Joc Pederson, Ben Zobrist, Jake Peavy, Jack Morris, Bill Skowron, Don Gullett, and Ryan Theriot.

He held the National League (NL) record for career saves from 1958 until 1962; his 96 career saves ranked fourth in MLB history when he retired. He also set a Dodgers franchise record of 425 career games pitched.

Youth and early career

Labine was born in Lincoln, Rhode Island, grew up in nearby Woonsocket, and served as a paratrooper in World War II. After compiling a 5–1 record for Brooklyn as a rookie in 1951, he shut out the New York Giants in game 2 of the National League pennant playoff, 10–0. Labine went on to enjoy several stellar seasons for the Dodgers as a relief pitcher. In 1955, the year the Dodgers finally brought a world championship to Brooklyn, he led the NL with 60 games pitched and 10 relief victories, and earned a career-best 13 wins overall. Although the save was not yet an official statistic, he has been retroactively credited with leading the NL twice (1956 and '57) in that category, with 19 and 17, respectively, and was an All-Star both years.

Move to Los Angeles and late career

Labine accompanied the Dodgers to Los Angeles when they relocated after the 1957 season, and in 1958 surpassed Al Brazle's NL record of 60 career saves. In 1959, he broke Brickyard Kennedy's franchise record of 381 games pitched; the Dodgers won the World Series again that year, defeating the Chicago White Sox, although Labine pitched only one inning in game 1's blowout loss.

His career appeared to be in jeopardy in 1960, when the Dodgers traded him to the Detroit Tigers in June after Labine had compiled an earned-run average (ERA) of 5.82. The Tigers subsequently released him on August 15, 1960, after he pitched 14 games for them, going 0–3, with an ERA of 5.12. The Pittsburgh Pirates signed Labine the following day.

The Pirates were in the NL pennant race and needed another right-handed reliever to complement Roy Face. Labine proved to be a valuable addition to the Pirates' bullpen. In 15 games for the Pirates through the remainder of the season, he compiled a record of 3–0 with three saves and an ERA of 1.48, as he helped the Pirates win the NL pennant and go on to the 1960 World Series, but Labine appeared only in three blowout losses during the series win over the New York Yankees.

After remaining with the Pirates in 1961, he ended his career with the New York Mets, pitching in three games during the Mets' debut 1962 season, including an inning in the Mets' first game. Later that year, the Pirates' Roy Face passed Labine's NL mark of 94 career saves.

Over all or parts of 13 seasons, Labine appeared in 513 games, winning 77 and losing 56 (.579), with a 3.63 ERA. He appeared in 13 World Series games, winning two and losing two, with a 3.16 ERA. His 96 career saves then trailed only Johnny Murphy (107), Ellis Kinder (102), and Firpo Marberry (101) in major league history. In 1966, Labine's Dodger career records of 425 games pitched and 83 saves were broken by Don Drysdale and Ron Perranoski, respectively.

Life after baseball

Following his retirement from baseball, Labine settled again in the Woonsocket area, where he became a designer of men's athletic wear, serving as general manager for the sporting goods division of the Jacob Finklestein's & Sons manufacturing company. His son, Jay, joined the Marine Corps and lost a leg while serving in Vietnam after stepping on a mine.  Labine died at age 80 in Vero Beach, Florida, one week after undergoing exploratory brain surgery following a bout with pneumonia; he had been serving as an instructor at the Dodgers' adult fantasy camp at their Dodgertown headquarters.

See also
 List of Major League Baseball annual saves leaders

References

External links

Clem Labine
SABR Biography Project. Article written by Alfonso Tusa

1926 births
2007 deaths
United States Army personnel of World War II
American people of French-Canadian descent
Asheville Tourists players
Baseball players from Rhode Island
Brooklyn Dodgers players
Detroit Tigers players
Greenville Spinners players
Los Angeles Dodgers players
Major League Baseball pitchers
National League All-Stars
Navegantes del Magallanes players
American expatriate baseball players in Venezuela
New York Mets players
Newport News Dodgers players
People from Woonsocket, Rhode Island
Pittsburgh Pirates players
Pueblo Dodgers players
St. Paul Saints (AA) players
United States Army soldiers
Paratroopers